Gail Mutrux (born October 2, 1945) is an American film producer, best known for her films Donnie Brasco, Nurse Betty, and Kinsey.

Pretty Pictures, Mutrux's company, produces most of her films including the adaptation of The Danish Girl. She started the company with director Neil LaBute in 2001.

Selected filmography as producer
She was a producer in all films unless otherwise noted.

Film

Miscellaneous crew

Production manager

Thanks

Television

References

External links
 

1945 births
American film producers
Living people